CBSI-FM is a French-language Canadian radio station located in Sept-Îles, Quebec.

Owned and operated by Société Radio-Canada, it broadcasts on 98.1 MHz with an effective radiated power of 96,700 watts (class C) using an omnidirectional antenna.

The station has an ad-free news/talk format and is part of the Ici Radio-Canada Première network, which operates across Canada.

History
Formerly established on December 12, 1976, as a rebroadcaster of Matane's CBGA, CBSI-FM was launched as a separate station in 1982. The station now has several rebroadcasters of its own throughout Quebec's Côte-Nord and in parts of Labrador.

Programming
The station's current local programs are Bonjour la côte, in the mornings from 6 a.m. to 9 a.m., and Boréale 138 in the afternoons, 3:30 p.m. to 6 p.m. CBSI-FM also co-produces D'Est en est, a pan-regional program produced in turn with CBGA-FM and CJBR-FM Rimouski, and heard afternoons during the summer months. On public holidays, its local programs are replaced with local shows airing provincewide produced by different outlets in turn (except Montreal and Quebec City). Its Saturday morning program, Samedi et rien d'autre, originates from CBF-FM Montreal.

Transmitters

In 1986, the CBC received CRTC approval to switch frequencies on a number of CBSI low-power AM rebroadcasters in Quebec.

CBSI-FM-2 previously broadcast as CFKL, a local station owned by Hollinger-Ungava Transport Ltd. that operated at 1230 kHz. It is not known when the station began broadcasting, nor when it became a rebroadcaster of Radio-Canada, which acquired the station in 1965. By 1986, it was known as CBSI-2 (it would become CBSI-FM-2 upon conversion to 91.1 FM on July 15, 1994).

On September 1, 2017, the CBC applied to convert CBSI-5 1100 kHz to 99.9 MHz. On February 7, 2018, the CBC received approval from the CRTC to move CBSI-5 to 99.9 FM.

On April 19, 2018, the CBC applied to convert CBSI-8 1550 to 99.9 MHz. This was approved on September 6, 2018.

On November 23, 2021, the CBC submitted an application to convert CBSI-14 to 105.9 MHz. The CRTC approved the CBC's application on February 2, 2022.

References

External links
  Ici Radio-Canada Première
 
 

Bsi
Bsi
Bsi
Bsi
Sept-Îles, Quebec
Radio stations established in 1982
1982 establishments in Quebec